Hugo Pieters (10 May 1953) is a former Belgian footballer who played as goalkeeper.

Honours 

 Club Brugge

 Belgian First Division: 1975–76
 UEFA Cup: 1975-76 (runner-up)

References 

Belgian footballers
Belgian Pro League players
Association football goalkeepers
Club Brugge KV players